Danie Poolman (born 10 March 1989) is a South African former professional rugby union player. He played for Irish provincial side Connacht Rugby in the Pro12 until 2017 followed by a spell playing amateur rugby in Dublin with Bective Rangers in the Leinster League. He primarily plays on the wing or in the centre. Born in Pretoria, he formerly played for Western Province in South Africa's Currie Cup, and Super Rugby side the Stormers. Qualified to play for Ireland by residence since 2015, Poolman indicated his intention to do so.

Career

Youth and Varsity rugby

Poolman played schoolboy rugby for Paul Roos Gymnasium and was included in the  Under-18 side at the 2007 Craven Week tournament. He played for the  side in 2008 and for their Under-21 sides in 2009 and 2010. He finished as the top try scorer in the 2010 Under-21 Provincial Championship competition, scoring 17 tries in just 14 appearances.

He started in all nine of Maties' matches in the competition and scored six tries, including a try early in the second half of the final, helping Maties beat local rivals  17–14 to clinch the Varsity Cup for a third consecutive season.

Western Province and Stormers

Poolman was then included in the  side for the 2010 Vodacom Cup competition. He made his first class debut for them by coming on as a substitute in their match against  on 10 April 2010.

He eventually made his Currie Cup debut during the 2011 Currie Cup season in Western Province's match against  and made 13 appearances in the competition, scoring 4 tries. He made just two appearances for the Stormers in the 2012 Super Rugby season, with Gio Aplon and Gerhard van den Heever being preferred to him in the starting line-up. Instead, he dropped down to the Western Province side for the 2012 Vodacom Cup competition, scoring two tries in eight starts.

Connacht

In June 2012, it was announced that he had been released from his Western Province contract to join Irish team Connacht ahead of the 2012–2013 season, signing on a three-year deal.

Poolman made his debut for Connacht in the 2012–13 Pro12 as a replacement against the Ospreys on 27 October 2012. He made his first start in the team's next Pro12 game, against Benetton Treviso on November, and also scored his first try for the side. Poolman made his European debut for Connacht on 7 December 2012 against Biarritz in the 2012–13 Heineken Cup. He played in three of the team's Heineken Cup matches in his debut season, and made 16 Pro12 appearances, scoring 5 tries. He left Connacht at the end of the 2016-17 season

External links
Connacht profile

itsrugby.co.uk profile

References

Living people
1989 births
Afrikaner people
Buccaneers RFC players
Connacht Rugby players
Expatriate rugby union players in Ireland
Rugby union wings
South African expatriate sportspeople in Ireland
South African expatriate rugby union players
South African rugby union players
Rugby union players from Pretoria
Stormers players
Western Province (rugby union) players